Ramosatidia is a monotypic genus of east Asian sac spiders containing the single species, Ramosatidia situ. It was first described by J. S. Zhang, H. Yu and S. Q. Li in 2021, and it has only been found in China.

See also
 List of Clubionidae species

References

Monotypic Clubionidae genera
Spiders of China